The Dobrotiva Formation is a fossil formation situated in the North West of the Czech Republic.  The town of Osek is built upon it.  The Dobrotiva formation contains many valuable trilobites.

References

Geologic formations of the Czech Republic
Ordovician southern paleotemperate deposits